The 1953 NBA draft was the seventh annual draft of the National Basketball Association (NBA). The draft was held on April 24, 1953, before the 1953–54 season. In this draft, nine remaining NBA teams took turns selecting amateur U.S. college basketball players. In each round, the teams select in reverse order of their win–loss record in the previous season. The draft consisted of 19 rounds comprising 122 players selected.

Draft selections and draftee career notes
Ray Felix from Long Island University was selected first overall by the Baltimore Bullets and went on to win the Rookie of the Year Award in his first season. Ernie Beck and Walter Dukes were selected before the draft as Philadelphia Warriors' and New York Knicks' territorial picks respectively. Three players from this draft, Bob Houbregs, Frank Ramsey and Cliff Hagan, have been inducted to the Basketball Hall of Fame.

Key

Draft

Other picks
The following list includes other draft picks who have appeared in at least one NBA game.

Notable undrafted players
These players were not selected in the 1953 draft but played at least one game in the NBA.

See also
 List of first overall NBA draft picks

References
General

Specific

External links
NBA.com
NBA.com: NBA Draft History

Draft
National Basketball Association draft
NBA draft
NBA draft
1950s in Boston
Basketball in Boston
Events in Boston